Lambert Hamel (born 7 June 1940 in Ludwigshafen) is a German television and film actor.

Selected filmography

External links
 

1940 births
Living people
German male television actors
German male film actors
20th-century German male actors
21st-century German male actors
People from Ludwigshafen